is a Japanese romance television drama series which stars Hideaki Takizawa and Kyoko Fukada and aired on TBS in 2001. It was written by Shinji Nojima, and directed by Nobuhiro Doi and Hiroshi Matsubara.

Plot 
At some point, Manato Irie (Hideaki Takizawa) began to withdraw himself from the world. Even when picked on, it's not the real Irie, but an act. However one day he meets a strange girl - Yui Misawa (Kyoko Fukada). Yui, who finds the tedium of everyday life unbearable, teases Manato with her almost too upfront and honest manner. Alone and afraid Manato wavers but finds himself drawn to her. But his feelings for Yui are doomed to be unrequited, when he discovers that Yui is none other than his new step sister.
While he struggles with his feelings for Yui, Manato begins to receive blue love letters in his shoe locker at school. He eventually discovers that they were left there by his next-door neighbour, Haruka (Uchiyama Rina). Meanwhile, Yui finds herself falling for senpai Saeki(Yōsuke Kubozuka), who in turn is having an affair with his teacher, Asami-sensei (Ishida Yuriko).

Cast 
 Hideaki Takizawa – Manato Irie
 Kyoko Fukada – Yui Mizawa
 Yōsuke Kubozuka – Tetsuya Saeki
 Rina Uchiyama – Haruka Sawamura
 Yuriko Ishida – Mariko Asami

Songs 
 Title song: Chiquitita by ABBA
 Closing Credits: SOS by ABBA

External links

References 

Kin'yō Dorama
2001 Japanese television series debuts
2001 Japanese television series endings
Television shows written by Shinji Nojima